Colliers Classic (also known as Grand Prix Aarhus) is a semi classic European bicycle race held in Aarhus, Denmark. Since 2005, the race has been organised as a 1.1 event on the UCI Europe Tour.

Name of the race
 1997 - 1999 : Grand Prix Aarhus
 2000 - 2001 : Samsung Mobile Grand Prix
 2002 - 2005 : CSC Classic
 Since 2006 : Colliers Classic

Winners

External links
 Official website 

Sport in Aarhus
Cycle races in Denmark
UCI Europe Tour races
Recurring sporting events established in 1997
Defunct cycling races in Denmark
Recurring sporting events disestablished in 2007
1997 establishments in Denmark
2007 disestablishments in Denmark